Ernestine Jackson (born September 18, 1942) is an American actress and singer.

Early life
Born in Corpus Christi, Texas, Jackson made her Broadway debut in 1967 as Irene Molloy in the all-black cast of Hello, Dolly! starring Pearl Bailey.

Career 
In 1973, Jackson originated the role of Ruth Younger in Raisin, her performance winning her the Theatre World Award and a nomination for the Tony Award for Best Performance by a Featured Actress in a Musical. Additional Broadway credits include Applause, The Bacchae, and the 1976 all-black revival of Guys and Dolls, for which she was nominated for the Tony Award for Best Performance by a Leading Actress in a Musical and the Drama Desk Award for Outstanding Featured Actress in a Musical. She also appeared in the 1966 revival of Show Boat at the New York State Theater and the 1967 revival of Finian's Rainbow at New York City Center.

Jackson portrayed Alberta Hunter in Cookin' at the Cookery: The Music and Times of Alberta Hunter, a revue that originated at the Hippodrome State Theatre in Gainesville, Florida in 1997 and then played in various venues in the United States, such as the Lyceum Stage, San Diego, California in March and April 2003. Jackson appeared in the revue at the Boston University Theatre, presented by the Huntington Theatre Company, in June 2003.

She portrayed Billie Holiday in the 2005 Long Wharf Theatre (Connecticut) production of Lady Day at Emerson's Bar and Grill. In reviewing her performance, Frank Rizzo of Variety said she "nicely suggests rather than mimics the famous Holiday" and added, "Jackson handles the gliding jazz minimalism beautifully. She makes Holiday's fleeting happiness a joy and her suffering an art." In 2007 she portrayed entertainer Ethel Waters in Ethel Waters: His Eye is On the Sparrow at the Bristol Riverside Theatre in Bristol, Pennsylvania. Jackson's feature films include The Bonfire of the Vanities, Freedomland, Steam, and Forged, scheduled for release in 2010. On television she has appeared in Roots: The Next Generations, A Man Called Hawk, Law & Order, The West Wing, and Law & Order: Criminal Intent.

Filmography

Film

Television

Video games

References

External links

20th-century African-American women singers
People from Corpus Christi, Texas
Living people
African-American actresses
American television actresses
American film actresses
American stage actresses
21st-century African-American people
21st-century African-American women
1942 births